The MATS/2.6 is a scatterable Italian circular, plastic-cased minimum metal blast resistant anti-tank blast mine. It is very similar to the MATS/2, except that it uses a smooth pressure plate rather than a griddle pressure plate. It uses a pneumatic fuse which is resistant to shock and blast similar to the fuze fitted to the TS-50. The mine's plastic case is waterproof, and the mine can be scattered from a helicopter.

The mine is no longer in production.

Specifications
 Diameter: 260 mm
 Height: 90 mm
 Weight: 5 kg
 Explosive content: 2.4 kg of Trotyl / Ammonite 80

References
 Jane's Mines and Mine Clearance 2005-2006
 

Anti-tank mines of Italy